Orson Welles Commentaries (1945–46) is an ABC radio series produced and directed by Orson Welles. Featuring commentary by Welles, with reminiscences and readings from literature, the 15-minute weekly program aired Sunday afternoons at 1:15 p.m. ET beginning September 16, 1945. Lear Radio sponsored the program through the end of June 1946 when it failed to find a larger audience. The series was continued by ABC as a sustaining show through October 6, 1946. Orson Welles Commentaries was the last of Welles's own radio shows.

Episodes

References

1940s American radio programs
1945 radio programme debuts
1946 radio programme endings
American talk radio programs
ABC radio programs
Works by Orson Welles